Sinotrans Shipping Ltd. is one of the largest shipping companies in China and a listed subsidiary of China Merchants Group headquartered in Hong Kong. It is engaged in vessel time and voyage chartering through its Dry Bulk Shipping and Container Shipping segments, alongside freight and container forwarding and container line services. The firm also provides shipping agency and fleet management services and ships liquefied natural gas, among other activities.

Sinotrans Shipping was established in 2003 as a subsidiary of Sinotrans Limited, and was listed on the Hong Kong Stock Exchange in 2007 with an IPO price of HK$8.28 per share,. Sinotrans Limited subsequently merged in 2009 with CSC to form Sinotrans-CSC. A strategic merger of this new parent with China Merchants Group received approval from the State Council of the People's Republic of China in December 2015, and this resulted in the transfer (by April 2017) of Sinotrans Shipping to its current holding company.

References

Government-owned companies of China
Logistics companies of China
Shipping companies of China
Companies formerly listed on the Hong Kong Stock Exchange
Chinese companies established in 2003
2003 establishments in China